Cabe or CABE may refer to:

Cabe (river), a tributary of the Sil River in Spain
CABE, the Chartered Association of Building Engineers, professional body for building engineers in the UK and overseas established in 1925
CABE, the Commission for Architecture and the Built Environment, body of the UK government from 1999 to 2011
 CABE, Central Advisory Board of Education, government board in India which prepared the draft bill for the Right of Children to Free and Compulsory Education Act, 2009

Surname
Cabe is a reduced form of the surname MacCabe. People with that name include:

Real people
 Gloria Cabe (born 1941), American politician and political advisor

Fictional characters
 Bethany Cabe, in the Marvel comics Iron Man
 Joshua Cabe, in the 1972 western The Daughters of Joshua Cabe